The following is a list of the annual goal scoring champions of the top Russian ice hockey league of each era, from the Soviet Championship League to the current Kontinental Hockey League.

Soviet Championship

1946–47 Anatoli Tarasov
1947–48 Vsevolod Bobrov
1948–49 Alexei Guryshev - PHC Krylya Sovetov
1949–50 Viktor Shuvalov
1950–51 Vsevolod Bobrov
1951–52 Vsevolod Bobrov
1952–53 Alexei Guryshev - PHC Krylya Sovetov
1953–54 Belyaev Bekyashev
1954–55 Alexei Guryshev - PHC Krylya Sovetov
1955–56 Vladimir Grebennikov
1956–57 Alexei Guryshev - PHC Krylya Sovetov
1957–58 Alexei Guryshev - PHC Krylya Sovetov
1958–59 Konstantin Loktev
1959–60 Robert Sakharovsky - Torpedo Gorky
1960–61 Yuri Paramoshkin
1961–62 Yevgeni Groshev - PHC Krylya Sovetov
1962–63 Veniamin Alexandrov - CSKA Moscow
1963–64 Alexander Almetov - CSKA Moscow
1964–65 Victor Tsyplakov - Lokomotiv Moscow
1965–66 Anatoli Firsov
1966–67 Vyacheslav Starshinov - Spartak Moscow
1967–68 Vyacheslav Starshinov - Spartak Moscow
1968–69 Alexander Yakushev - Spartak Moscow
1969–70 Vladimir Petrov - CSKA Moscow
1970–71 Valeri Kharlamov - CSKA Moscow
1971–72 Vladimir Vikulov - CSKA Moscow
1972–73 Vladimir Petrov - CSKA Moscow
1973–74 Alexander Yakushev - Spartak Moscow
1974–75 Boris Mikhailov - CSKA Moscow
1975–76 Helmuts Balderis - Dinamo Riga; Boris Mikhailov - CSKA Moscow; Alexander Yakushev - Spartak Moscow
1976–77 Helmuts Balderis - Dinamo Riga
1977–78 Boris Mikhailov - CSKA Moscow
1978–79 Vladimir Petrov - CSKA Moscow
1979–80 Sergei Makarov - CSKA Moscow
1980–81 Sergei Makarov - CSKA Moscow
1981–82 Aleksandr Kozhevnikov - Spartak Moscow
1982–83 Alexei Frolikov - Dinamo Riga
1983–84 Vladimir Krutov - CSKA Moscow
1984–85 Helmuts Balderis - Dinamo Riga
1985–86 Vladimir Krutov - CSKA Moscow
1986–87 Vladimir Krutov - CSKA Moscow
1987–88 Andrei Khomutov - CSKA Moscow
1988–89 Sergei Makarov - CSKA Moscow
1989–90 Ramil Yuldashev - Sokil Kiev
1990–91 Ramil Yuldashev - Sokil Kiev

CIS Championship

1991-92 Roman Oksiuta - Khimik Voskresensk; Nikolai Borschevsky - Spartak Moscow

International Hockey League

1992-93 Alexei Tkachuk - Spartak Moscow
1993-94 Dmitri Denisov - Salavat Yulaev Ufa
1994-95 Dmitri Denisov - Salavat Yulaev Ufa
1995-96 Valentin Morozov - CSKA Moscow; Alexander Korolyuk - Krylya Sovetov

Russian Superleague

1996-97 Mikhail Ivanov - Severstal Cherepovets
1997-98 Oleg Antonenko - Neftekhimik Nizhnekamsk, Ak Bars Kazan; Vitali Prokhorov - Spartak Moscow
1998-99 Yevgeni Koreshkov - Metallurg Magnitogorsk
1999-2000 Alexander Gulyavtsev - Molot-Prikamye Perm
2000-01 Alexander Golts - Metallurg Magnitogorsk
2001-02 Andrei Kovalenko - Lokomotiv Yaroslavl
2002-03 Maxim Spiridonov - Amur Khabarovsk
2003-04 Andrei Kovalenko - Lokomotiv Yaroslavl; Eduard Kudermetov - Metallurg Magnitogorsk
2004-05 Dmitry Zatonsky - Avangard Omsk
2005-06 Alexei Morozov - Ak Bars Kazan
2006-07 Alexei Morozov - Ak Bars Kazan
2007-08 Sergei Mozyakin - Atlant Moscow Oblast

Kontinental Hockey League

2008–09 Pavel Brendl - Torpedo Nizhny Novgorod; Jan Marek - Metallurg Magnitogorsk
2009–10 Marcel Hossa - Dinamo Riga
2010–11 Roman Červenka - Avangard Omsk
2011–12 Brandon Bochenski - Barys Astana
2012–13 Sergei Mozyakin - Metallurg Magnitogorsk
2013–14 Sergei Mozyakin - Metallurg Magnitogorsk
2014–15 Steve Moses - Jokerit
2015–16 Sergei Mozyakin - Metallurg Magnitogorsk
2016–17 Sergei Mozyakin - Metallurg Magnitogorsk

See also
List of Soviet and Russian ice hockey champions
List of Soviet and Russian ice hockey scoring champions
Soviet MVP (hockey)

Sources
CCCP Hockey International
Internet Hockey Database
A to Z of Ice Hockey.

Goal scoring champions
Kontinental Hockey League
Goal scoring champions
International Hockey League (1992–1996)
Goal scoring champions
Goal scoring champions
Ice hockey statistics